M. Balakrishnan (born 18 September 1938) is a Singaporean author, popularly known by his pen name Ma Ilangkannan. He was the first Tamil writer to receive the South East Asian Writers Award in 1982

Early life and career
Mayandiambalam Balakrishnan, M. Balakrishnan in short, was born in Singapore in 1938. His family moved to Tamil Nadu State in India when he was two years old, from where, he learnt to read and write Tamil.

After World War II, he returned to Singapore and continued his studies at Kalaimagal Tamil School. His family had to shift between rented houses and the uncertainty disrupted his education. Though his school education was hindered by circumstances, he was an avid reader of Tamil magazines and newspapers. Although he was unable to continue his education, he succeeded in acquiring knowledge and bettered his literary skills.

From 1957, Balakrishnan worked as a storeman with British military forces stationed in Singapore. Later he became a typist with the translation department of the Ministry of Culture, where he worked until 1997.

References

1938 births
Singaporean people of Tamil descent
Singaporean people of Indian descent
S.E.A. Write Award winners
Singaporean writers
Living people